Continental Chile is the name given to the Chilean territory located on the continental shelf of South America. This term serves to distinguish the South American area from the insular territories, known as Insular Chile, as from the Antarctic Chile (Chilean Antarctic Territory). The existence of this three areas of effective or claimed Chilean sovereignty is what supports the existing tricontinental principle in this country.

In addition, this term specifies the time zones  of mainland Chile and the Juan Fernández Islands and the Desventuradas Islands, located in the UTC−4 time zone, as "continental Chile" however, the Magallanes and Chilean Antarctica Region are in the UTC–3 time zone. Easter Island and the Isla Salas y Gómez, both in Polynesia, are in the UTC−6 time zone.

Continental Chile has a surface of 756,770 km2, representing 99.976% of the total surface of the country under effective administration. However, considering the claim in Antarctic, this percent fall down to only 37.71% of national's surface.

With regard to the population, according to the 2002 census, it had a total of 15,111,881 inhabitants, corresponding to 99.97% of the national population.

References 

Geography of Chile
Chile